Giannis Lazanas (born 5 May 1980) is a retired Greek football striker.

References

1980 births
Living people
Panegialios F.C. players
Patraikos F.C. players
Aris Thessaloniki F.C. players
Kallithea F.C. players
Atromitos F.C. players
Ionikos F.C. players
Anagennisi Karditsa F.C. players
Apollon Smyrnis F.C. players
Ethnikos Piraeus F.C. players
Super League Greece players
Association football forwards
Footballers from Athens
Greek footballers